Lac-Simon is a First Nations reserve (also known as Simosagigan) and lake in Abitibi-Témiscamingue, Quebec located  south-east of Val-d'Or.

There are also a number of residential cottages and summer houses around the lake. There are several small islands on it, some of which are large enough to camp on.

Around 1910, the missionary Étienne Blanchin and the Hudson's Bay Company encouraged Algonquin people from Kitcisakik (Grand-Lac-Victoria)  to come and establish a community at Lac-Simon. Other Algonquins were then invited to move to Lac-Simon.

In the 1950s, a small Republic RC-3 Seabee with four people on board crashed and sank in very deep water in the lake.

The return of deer to the area was featured in an episode of Lorne Greene's New Wilderness in the mid-1980s.

References

External links
Official site (French)

Algonquin
Communities in Abitibi-Témiscamingue
Indian reserves in Quebec